Kemijärvi is a town and municipality of Finland. It is located in the province of Lapland.

History 
The first permanent settler inhabitant of Kemijärvi was Paavali Ollinpoika Halonen, who moved from the region of Oulu, from Niskakylä, Utajärvi to Kemijärvi about 1580. His wife was Anna Laurintytär Halonen, and their children were Paavo, Olli and Pekka Halonen. Paavali's place of residence is known today as Halosenranta. As the first settlers moved to Kemijärvi, the area was no longer inhabited exclusively by the Sami people, but Ämmänvaara in the area of the municipality is an ancient sacrificial place of Samis.

The railway reached Kemijärvi in 1934. It was extended north to Salla and what is now Russia during World War II, though the line is currently moribund beyond Kemijärvi. Kemijärvi railway station has passenger train service to Rovaniemi, Oulu and Helsinki. The direct overnight train service between Kemijärvi and Helsinki was controversially withdrawn in September 2006, with VR (Finnish Railways) stating that its new sleeping car trains could not operate with the diesel locomotives needed for the (then) non-electrified railway north of Rovaniemi.

However, a year later, the Ministry of Transport and Communications and VR reached an agreement concerning partial public funding of the service, which was restored in 2008 with a diesel generator car supplying head-end power to the passenger cars. The generator car disappeared from the train in March 2014 when the electrification extension from Rovaniemi to Kemijärvi was inaugurated, an event which also assured Kemijärvi a permanent place in the VR network.

On 9 May 1986, a BAE Hawk Mk 51 crashed in Kemijärvi whilst practising for a flight display due to loss of orientation. The pilot, First Lieutenant M. Kähkönen, died upon impact.

Geography 
Surrounding municipalities are Pelkosenniemi in the north, Salla in the east, Posio in the south and Rovaniemi in the west. Villages located in the area of the municipality of Kemijärvi are Halosenranta, Hyypiö, Isokylä, Joutsijärvi, Juujärvi, Kallaanvaara, Kostamo, Leväranta, Luusua, Oinas, Perävaara, Ruopsa, Räisälä, Sipovaara, Soppela, Tapionniemi, Tohmo, Ulkuniemi, Varrio and Vuostimo.

The Eastern Lapland area where Kemijärvi is situated is well known for the nearby skiing resorts Suomu, Luosto, Pyhä and Salla, and Ruka in Kuusamo region. The beautiful Lake Kemijärvi, next to the town of Kemijärvi, is much appreciated as a place to visit during summertime. Lake Kemijärvi is surrounded by hills and large forests. Common fish species found include pike, perch and brown trout. Also, currently, Kemijärvi is the northernmost known lake in Finland with an indigenous population of zander (also known as walleye or pikeperch). River Kemijoki flows from Lake Kemijärvi to Rovaniemi and, further, to the sea at Kemi. Other popular summer pastimes besides fishing are hiking, trekking, boating and hunting.

Population 

Language 
The town is unilingually Finnish.

Transport

Rail 
The town is served by Kemijärvi railway station, with direct (overnight) trains to Helsinki.

Notable individuals 
 Timo Halonen, Mayor of Mikkeli
 Matti Juntura, volleyball player
 Pentti Kouri, investor and economist
 Matti Lahtela, Member of Parliament, municipal and provincial politician
 Olavi Lahtela, Member of Parliament and Minister
 Asko Oinas, former Governor of Lapland
 Markus Mustajärvi, Member of Parliament
 Seppo Säynäjäkangas, Professor
 Kari Väänänen, actor, screenwriter and director

Twin towns - sister cities
Kemijärvi is twinned with:
 Kandalaksha, Russia, since 1988
 Sōbetsu, Japan, since 1993
 Vadsø, Norway, since 1961

Historical places

References

External links 

Town of Kemijärvi – Official website 
Town of Kemijärvi – Tourist Official website
PDF map of Kemijärvi

 
Cities and towns in Finland
Populated lakeshore places in Finland